Mason Anthony Holgate (born 22 October 1996) is an English professional footballer who plays as a centre-back for  club Everton. Born in England, Holgate is eligible to play for Jamaica through family heritage.

Club career

Barnsley
Holgate was born in Doncaster, South Yorkshire and joined Barnsley at the age of nine.

Having progressed through the club's academy and reserve team, Holgate signed his first professional contract, keeping him at Barnsley until 2016. He made his League One debut for Barnsley on 2 December 2014, playing the full ninety minutes of a 1–1 draw with Doncaster Rovers at Oakwell. Following this, the club were determined to negotiate a longer-term contract for Holgate. After inclusion in the first team, Holgate scored his first Barnsley goal, in a 5–0 win over Rochdale in the last game of the season.

Following a successful debut season at Barnsley, Holgate was named 2014–15 Young Player of the Year. In addition to this award, press speculation linked Holgate with a number of Premier League clubs; in July 2015, he went on trial at Manchester United.

Everton
On 13 August 2015, Holgate signed a five-year deal to join Premier League side Everton for a reported fee of £2 million. On 13 August 2016, a year after he signed for the club, Holgate made his Premier League debut in the 1–1 draw with Tottenham Hotspur in the Premier League. As Séamus Coleman suffered a broken leg in a World Cup qualifier game in March 2017, which caused him missing out for nearly a year, Holgate was selected by Ronald Koeman as a replacement at the right back position in the latter part of season.

Holgate switched his squad number from 30 to 2 for the 2018–19 season, as the previous owner, French midfielder Morgan Schneiderlin wore number 18 instead. Yet the move did not mean Holgate played a more important role within the season. He only made five league appearances before loaned out to West Bromwich Albion.

On 29 October 2019, Holgate started for the EFL Cup game against Watford. He scored the opener by nodding Theo Walcott's cross on the 73rd minute and this was his first ever goal for Everton. Richarlison scored another in stoppage time and helped Everton book their place in the quarter-finals of the Cup. He scored no goals in the Premier League but provided three assists. He played a through pass breaking the line and let Dominic Calvert-Lewin put the ball pass Matt Ryan in an easy way.

Following the arrival of Carlo Ancelotti, Holgate established himself as a regular centre back at Everton although he was deployed as defensive midfielder on some occasions. In the 2019–20 season, he made 32 appearances for the Toffees in all competition, including 27 in the league.

After Jonjoe Kenny finished his season-long loan spell at Schalke 04, he took up the number 2 shirt and Holgate took number 4 this time. Holgate left injured in a pre-season game with Preston North End, which kept him out of action for two months. He was named as captain for a home game against Leeds United on 28 November 2020, a game which Everton went on to lose 1–0. On 16 December 2020, he scored his first Premier League goal in a 2–0 away win against Leicester City.

West Bromwich Albion (loan)
On 31 December 2018, Holgate joined Championship side West Bromwich Albion on loan until the end of the season.

International career
Holgate is of Jamaican descent through his grandparents, and is eligible to represent both England and Jamaica internationally. Holgate was the starting right-back for England under-21 during the 2017 UEFA European Under-21 Championship in June 2017.

Holgate said in an interview with The Voice in March 2020 that he would be open to representing the Jamaica national team, though he had not put much thought into his international future. However, he also said in an interview to Sky Sports the same month that he wanted to be called up to England, stating: "Everybody wants to play for England. When you're a kid, that's the ultimate, but it's down to me to decide that through playing well for Everton".

Despite being born in England and his previous England caps, in March 2021 it was reported that Holgate would be called up to the Jamaica national team, as part of a plot by the Jamaican Football Federation to purposely call up a number of English players in order to improve the nation's chances of qualifying for the 2022 World Cup. JFF president Michael Ricketts said that Holgate was applying for a Jamaican passport in order to play for the side. However, he was not one of the six England-born players called up to Jamaica for the first time for the match against the United States on 25 March 2021.

Career statistics

Club

References

External links

Profile at the Everton F.C. website

1996 births
Living people
Footballers from Doncaster
English footballers
England youth international footballers
England under-21 international footballers
Association football defenders
Barnsley F.C. players
Everton F.C. players
English Football League players
Premier League players
English people of Jamaican descent
West Bromwich Albion F.C. players